Dhruv Bhandari (born 28 December 1959) is an Indian sailor. He competed in the 470 event at the 1984 Summer Olympics.

References

External links
 

1959 births
Living people
Indian male sailors (sport)
Olympic sailors of India
Sailors at the 1984 Summer Olympics – 470
Place of birth missing (living people)
Sailors at the 1986 Asian Games
Medalists at the 1986 Asian Games
Asian Games silver medalists for India
Asian Games medalists in sailing
Recipients of the Arjuna Award